Riverview High School is a public high school in Riverview, Florida, U.S.A. It is operated as part of the Hillsborough County Public Schools district.

History 
In February 1996, the Hillsborough County School Board purchased two forty-acre plots from two different owners for a total of $2,050,000 on the southeast corner of Boyette Road and Balm Riverview Road, in Riverview, Florida, to be the location of a high school. Ground was broken in January 1997 and construction began in preparation for opening of school in August 1998.

On January 20, 1998, Riverview High School's first principal, J. Vince Thompson, was appointed. Mr. Thompson held meetings during the month of February 1998 with students from East Bay High School, Brandon High School, Bloomingdale High School, Progress Village Middle School, Burns Middle School, and McLane Middle School to discuss the implementation of block scheduling and the selection of a school mascot and school colors; block scheduling was approved, the colors of black, royal blue, and silver were selected as school colors, and the Sharks picked as the school mascot. On March 17, 1998, the School Board approved the mascot and the colors.

Notable alumni 
 Jahleel Addae (2008): NFL football player
 Andrew Barbosa professional baseball pitcher
 Orson Charles American football tight end and fullback played at Riverview before transferring to Plant
 Jason Harmon (2004): professional football player
 Tyrone McKenzie (2004): NFL football player
 Roderick Strong: born Christopher Lindsey, wrestler
 Jacquian Williams (2006): NFL football player

References

External links 
 Riverview High School

High schools in Hillsborough County, Florida
Educational institutions established in 1998
Public high schools in Florida
1998 establishments in Florida